Friedrich Jeckeln (2 February 1895 – 3 February 1946) was a German SS commander during the Nazi era. He served as a Higher SS and Police Leader in the occupied Soviet Union during World War II. Jeckeln was the commander of one of the largest collection of Einsatzgruppen death squads and was personally responsible for ordering and organising the deaths of over 100,000 Jews, Romani and others designated by the Nazis as "undesirables". After the end of World War II in Europe, Jeckeln was convicted of war crimes by a Soviet military tribunal in Riga and executed in 1946.

SS career

Jeckeln served in World War I as an officer. After being discharged following Germany's defeat, Jeckeln worked as an engineer before joining the Nazi Party on 1 October 1929. In January 1931, he was accepted into the Schutzstaffel (SS). By the end of 1931 he was placed in charge of a regiment and then a brigade. In 1932, Jeckeln was elected as a member of the Reichstag. In January 1933, when the Nazi Party came to national power, Jeckeln was put in charge of SS group South. In 1936, he was appointed SS and Police Leader and later promoted to SS-Obergruppenführer.

Jeckeln was known for ruthlessness and brutality. Political opponents, especially members of the KPD, SPD and the unions, were pursued relentlessly until their death. Together with party member Friedrich Alpers, Jeckeln was primarily responsible for the Rieseberg Murders in the summer of 1933.

Holocaust perpetrator

After the Second World War began, Jeckeln was transferred to the Waffen-SS. As was the practice in the SS, Jeckeln took a lower rank from his Allgemeine-SS position and served as an officer in Regiment 2 of the Totenkopf Division. In 1941, he was transferred by Reichsführer-SS Heinrich Himmler to serve as Higher SS and Police Leader (HSSPF) of Southern, then later in 1941, of Northern Russia. In this role Jeckeln assumed control of all SS-Einsatzgruppen mass killings and security operations in his district.

Jeckeln developed a method of killing large numbers of people, over the course of the mass killings he had organised in the Ukraine, which included (amongst others) Babi Yar and the Kamianets-Podilskyi Massacre. First applied in the Rumbula massacre on 30 November and 8 December 1941, the method (which became known as the "Jeckeln System") involved dividing staff into separate groups, each of which specialised in a separate part of the process:

 The Security Service (SD) men rousted the people out of their houses in the Riga Ghetto.
 The people to be murdered (typically Jews) were organised into columns of 500-1,000 people; and driven to the killing grounds about 10 kilometres to the south.
 The Order Police (Orpo) led the columns to the killing grounds.
 3 pits where the killing would be done simultaneously had been dug in advance.
 The victims were stripped of their clothing and valuables.
 The victims were run through a double cordon of guards on the way to the killing pits.
 The killers forced the victims to lie face down on the trench floor, or more often, on the bodies of the people who had just been shot.
 In order to save on the cost of bullets, each person was shot once in the back of the head with a Russian submachine gun. The shooters either walked among the dead in the trench, killing them from a range of 2 metres, or stood at the lip of the excavation and shot the prone victims below them. Anyone not killed outright was simply buried alive when the pit was covered up.

This system was referred to as "sardine packing" (Sardinenpackung). It was reported that some of the experienced Einsatzgruppen killers were horrified by its cruelty. At Rumbula, Jeckeln watched on both days of the massacre as 25,000 people were killed. Jeckeln proved to be an effective killer who cared nothing about murdering huge numbers of men, women, children and the elderly. One of only 3 survivors of the Rumbala massacre, Frida Michelson, escaped by pretending to be dead as the victims heaped shoes (later salvaged by Jeckeln's men) upon her:

By the end of August 1941, while commanding the Kommandostab SS First Brigade in Western Ukraine, Jeckeln had personally supervised the murder of more than 44,000 people, the largest total of Jews murdered that month.

On 27 January 1942, Jeckeln was awarded the War Merit Cross with Swords for killing 25,000 at Rumbula "on orders from the highest level." In February 1945, now a General der Waffen-SS und Polizei, Jeckeln was appointed to command the SS-Freiwilligen-Gebirgs-Korps and also served as Commander of Replacement Troops and Higher SS and Police Leader in Southwest Germany.

Trial and execution

Jeckeln was taken prisoner by Soviet troops near Halbe on 28 April 1945. Along with other German personnel, he was tried before a Soviet military tribunal in the Riga Trial in Latvia from 26 January 1946 to 3 February 1946. During the investigation, he was calm, clearly answering questions from investigators, in the dock he looked dull and impartial.

Jeckeln in his last words was restrained, he fully admitted his guilt and agreed to bear full responsibility for the activities of subordinate police, SS and SD in Ostland. Concluding his speech, he said:
I have to take full responsibility for what happened in the borders of Ostland, within SS, SD and the Gestapo. This greatly increases my guilt. My fate is in the hands of the High Court, and so I ask only to pay attention to mitigating circumstances. I will accept a sentence in full repentance which I will consider as worthy punishment.

Jeckeln and the other defendants were found guilty, sentenced to death and hanged in Riga on 3 February 1946 in front of some 4,000 spectators. Contrary to popular misconception, the execution did not happen in the territory of the former Riga Ghetto, but in Victory Square (Uzvaras laukums).

Awards
 Clasp to the Iron Cross (1939) 2nd Class (October 1941) & 1st Class (12 May 1942)
 War Merit Cross with Swords on 27 January 1942
 German Cross in Gold on 19 December 1943 as SS-Obergruppenführer and General of the Polizei in Kampfgruppe Jeckeln
 Knight's Cross of the Iron Cross with Oak Leaves
 Knight's Cross on 27 August 1944 as SS-Obergruppenführer and General of the Waffen-SS, Höherer SS- and Polizei and leader of the Höhere SS- und Polizeiführer Northern Russia, leader of Kampfgruppe Jeckeln (lett. Polizei) in the 18. Armee.
 Oak Leaves on 8 March 1945 and SS-Obergruppenführer and General of the Waffen-SS and commanding general of the V. SS-Gebirgskorps

References

Citations

Bibliography

 Ezergailis, Andrew (1996). The Holocaust in Latvia 1941–1944 – The Missing Center, Historical Institute of Latvia (in association with the United States Holocaust Memorial Museum) Riga. .
 Fleming, Gerald (1984) Hitler and the Final Solution, University of California Berkeley. .

External links

Official website: Jewish Community in Latvia Joint project of Latvia's Ministry of Foreign Affairs, the Latvian Jewish Community, and the Democracy Commission of the US Embassy; available in English, Latvian and Russian languages.

1895 births
1946 deaths
Babi Yar
Einsatzgruppen personnel
Executed mass murderers
German Army personnel of World War I
German people convicted of war crimes
Gestapo personnel
Holocaust perpetrators in Estonia
Holocaust perpetrators in Latvia
Holocaust perpetrators in Lithuania
Holocaust perpetrators in Ukraine
Members of the Reichstag of the Weimar Republic
Members of the Reichstag of Nazi Germany
Nazi Party politicians
Nazis executed by the Soviet Union by hanging
People executed for war crimes
People from Ortenaukreis
People from the Grand Duchy of Baden
Recipients of the Knight's Cross of the Iron Cross with Oak Leaves
Recipients of the War Merit Cross
Reichskommissariat Ukraine
Riga Ghetto
SS and Police Leaders
SS-Obergruppenführer
20th-century Freikorps personnel
Waffen-SS personnel
Military personnel from Baden-Württemberg